is a Japanese footballer who plays as a goalkeeper for  club Yokohama F. Marinos.

Career statistics

Club
.

References

1996 births
Living people
Ritsumeikan University alumni
Japanese footballers
Association football goalkeepers
Japan Football League players
J3 League players
Yokohama F. Marinos players
Honda FC players
Kagoshima United FC players